Invasion of the Body Snatchers is a 1978 American science-fiction horror film directed by Philip Kaufman and starring Donald Sutherland, Brooke Adams, Veronica Cartwright, Jeff Goldblum, and Leonard Nimoy. Released on December 22, 1978, it is based on the 1955 novel The Body Snatchers by Jack Finney. The novel was previously adapted into the 1956 film of the same name. The plot involves a San Francisco health inspector and his colleague who over the course of a few days discover that humans are being replaced by alien duplicates; each is a perfect copy of the person replaced, but devoid of human emotion.

Released in the United States over the Christmas weekend of 1978, Invasion of the Body Snatchers grossed nearly $25 million (equivalent to $ million in ) at the American box office. It initially received varied reviews from critics, though its critical reception has significantly improved in subsequent years, receiving a 92% on Rotten Tomatoes and also being hailed as one of the greatest remakes ever, as well as one of the best science-fiction horror films of all time.

Plot
A race of gelatinous creatures abandons their dying planet and travels to Earth, where they take the form of small pods with pink flowers. Elizabeth Driscoll, a laboratory scientist at the San Francisco Health Department, brings one of the flowers to her home. She awakens the next morning to discover her boyfriend, Geoffrey Howell, acting cold and distant and dropping nondescript debris in one of many garbage trucks that will become ubiquitous later on. Driscoll's colleague, Matthew Bennell, advises her to visit psychiatrist David Kibner, who is giving a presentation of his new book. As Elizabeth and Matthew drive to the bookstore, a hysterical civilian warns them of danger before being pursued by a mob, killed in a hit and run and surrounded by emotionless onlookers. At the presentation, Kibner skillfully sows doubt in Elizabeth and another woman about their shared misgivings concerning their respective partners. Meanwhile, Jack Bellicec, an aspiring writer and friend of Matthew, calls Matthew to investigate when a deformed body resembling Jack is found in his wife Nancy's mud parlor. Matthew goes to Elizabeth to warn her, but discovers a semi-formed duplicate of her. Matthew rescues Elizabeth and alerts the police, but the duplicates of Jack and Elizabeth disappear before their arrival.

Elizabeth deduces that the flowers are involved and examines it at the health department, failing to find records of it, while Matthew unsuccessfully attempts to alert several government agencies. Several acquaintances are revealed to have been facsimiled, and it is also revealed that children around the city are being taken to dark movie theaters so that they may fall asleep and be duplicated as well.  Matthew and his friends nearly incur the same fate in their sleep that night. Matthew calls the police, but realizes that the department has been duplicated. Matthew destroys his own clone with a hoe before escaping with the others. The "Pod People" – extraterrestrials emerging from later-stage pods and taking the forms and memories of sleeping humans as the originals crumble to ashes – set off in pursuit of Matthew's group. The duplicates emit a shrill scream when they discover a human being among them. Jack and Nancy create a distraction and Matthew and Elizabeth escape back into the city, barely avoiding a taxi driver's trap once he identifies them as human. Matthew recognizes and unsuccessfully tries to wake Harry, a homeless busker lying asleep with his dog next to a mature pod. Matthew and Elizabeth take refuge in the health department, where they take a large dose of speed to remain awake. They are ambushed by the duplicates of Jack and Kibner and injected with sedatives while the latter expounds a rationalization of the alien strategy to replace terrestrial life. The previous dose of speed enables Matthew to escape with Elizabeth after killing Jack's double and locking Kibner's in a refrigerated room.

Matthew and Elizabeth reunite with Nancy, who has learned to evade the Pod People through hiding her emotions. The tactic works until Elizabeth screams at the sight of a dog-human duplicate amalgam (produced by Matthew's kick to the pod next to Harry and his dog) and their cover is blown. They separate from Nancy in their escape and board a truck delivering plants to Pier 70, where Pod People are processing them.

They hide near the pier and Matthew declares his love for Elizabeth while trying to keep her awake. He hears music from a nearby ship and scouts the area, only to discover the ship being loaded with pods to send overseas to other widely populated cities. Elizabeth falls asleep and disintegrates in his arms shortly after his return. Horrified and enraged, Matthew flees her duplicate, breaks into the docks’ warehouse and burns down the building, destroying several plants and killing many Pod People, before hiding underneath the pier. More pursuers arrive in the area and search for him, confidently asserting that he will soon fall asleep nevertheless.

Soon after, Matthew returns to work at the health department with the duplicated employees, including Elizabeth, and witnesses several schoolchildren being taken for duplication while more plants are being prepared for the remaining West Coast cities. Afterwards, Matthew heads towards City Hall and encounters Nancy. When she smiles and calls out his name, Matthew points at her and emits the distinctive Pod shriek. Nancy, now the only on-screen character who remains human, screams helplessly.

Cast
 Donald Sutherland as Matthew Bennell
 Brooke Adams as Elizabeth Driscoll
 Jeff Goldblum as Jack Bellicec
 Veronica Cartwright as Nancy Bellicec
 Leonard Nimoy as Dr. David Kibner
 Art Hindle as Dr. Geoffrey Howell
 Lelia Goldoni as Katherine Hendley
 Kevin McCarthy as Running Man (McCarthy starred in the original 1956 version as Dr. Miles Bennell)
 Don Siegel as Taxi Driver (Siegel was the director of the 1956 film version)
 Tom Luddy as Ted Hendley
 Stan Ritchie as Stan
 David Fisher as Mr. Gianni
 Tom Dahlgren as Detective
 Gary Goodrow as Boccardo
 Jerry Walter as Henri, Restaurant Owner
 Maurice Argent as Chef
Philip Kaufman's wife Rose Kaufman played Outraged Woman, who argues with Jack at the book party, while Robert Duvall appeared as an uncredited priest on a swing, and Kaufman himself has two uncredited cameos, one as the man who bothers Bennell in a phone booth, and another as the voice of one of the officials whom Bennell contacts.

Production
Director Philip Kaufman had been a fan of the 1956 film, which he likened to "great radio", although he had not read the novel until after he agreed to direct the film. "I thought, 'Well this doesn't have to be a remake as such. It can be a new envisioning that was a variation on a theme'," he said on the film's 40th anniversary. The first change he anticipated was filming in color; the second was changing the location to San Francisco. "Could it happen in the city I love the most? The city with the most advanced, progressive therapies, politics and so forth? What would happen in a place like that if the pods landed there and that element of 'poddiness' was spread?"

Cinematographer Michael Chapman worked with Kaufman to try to capture the film noir feel of the original in color, reviewing some classics of that genre before production. Some of the elements they borrowed were shots with light giving way to shadow and shooting from evocative angles. They used certain color tinges to indicate that some characters were now pod people. "When they're running along the Embarcadero and the huge shadows appear first, those are sort of classic film noir images", the director said.

Sound editor Ben Burtt, who had helped create many of the signature sounds from Star Wars the year before, also added to the film's ambience. Natural sounds that mix with the city's more industrial noises give way to just the latter as the film progresses. Among them are the grinding noises of garbage trucks, a common urban sound that slowly becomes horrific as it becomes clear that most of what they are processing is the discarded husks that remain of pre-pod human bodies. Burtt also designed the shriek when pod people see a surviving human, a sound Kaufman said was composed of many elements, including a pig's squeal.

All the special effects were created live for the camera. The scene at the beginning where the pods travel through space from their dead homeworld to San Francisco was one of the simplest. "I found some viscous material in an art store, I think we paid $12 for a big vat of it, and then [we dropped it] into solutions and reversed the film", Kaufman recalled. The dog with the banjo player's face included a mechanism whereby the creature appeared to lick itself.

The film features a number of cameo appearances. Kevin McCarthy, who played Dr. Miles Bennell in the original Invasion of the Body Snatchers, makes a brief appearance as an old man frantically screaming "They're coming!" to passing cars on the street. Though not playing the same character, Kaufman meant McCarthy's cameo as a nod to the original movie, as if he had been "metaphorically" running around the country since the original film shouting out his warnings. While they were filming the scene, in the Tenderloin, Kaufman recalls that a naked man lying on the street awoke and recognized McCarthy. After learning that they were filming the remake of the original Invasion of the Body Snatchers, he told McCarthy that that film was better. "We were in the middle of shooting the film and we got our first review!"

The original film's director, Don Siegel, appears as a taxi driver who alerts the police to Matthew and Elizabeth's attempt to flee the city. Robert Duvall is also seen briefly as a silent priest sitting on a swing set in the opening scene. Kaufman appears in dual roles both as a man wearing a hat who bothers Sutherland's character in a phone booth, and the voice of one of the officials Sutherland's character speaks to on the phone. His wife, Rose Kaufman, has a small role at the book party as the woman who argues with Jeff Goldblum's character. Chapman appears twice as a janitor in the health department.

McCarthy and Siegel played a role in shaping the film's twist ending. Before filming, Kaufman had sought out Siegel for advice, and while the two were talking in the latter's office, McCarthy happened to come in. The topic eventually came around to the original film's ending, which they regarded as "pat". After coming up with the ending he used, he kept it a secret from everyone involved in the filming except screenwriter W. D. Richter and producer Robert Solo. Sutherland was only informed of the scene the night before shooting; Kaufman is not sure Cartwright even knew until Sutherland turned around to point and shriek at her. The studio executives only learned of it when a cut was screened for them at George Lucas's house.

The film score by Denny Zeitlin was released on Perseverance Records; it is the only film score Zeitlin has composed. Jerry Garcia of the Grateful Dead recorded the banjo parts.

Kaufman said of the casting of Nimoy, "Leonard had got typecast and this [film] was an attempt to break him out of that", referring to the similar quirks that Dr. Kibner and his pod double had in common with Spock, the Star Trek character that Nimoy was best known for. According to Kaufman, it was Mike Medavoy, then head of production at United Artists, who suggested the casting of Donald Sutherland. Sutherland's character had a similar curly hairstyle as that of another character he portrayed in Don't Look Now (1973). "They would have to set his hair with pink rollers every day", recalled co-star Veronica Cartwright. According to Zeitlin, Sutherland's character was originally written as an "avocational jazz player" early in development.

The director encouraged his actors to fill the spaces between dialogue with facial expressions. "Often people on the set or at the studio are so worried about just getting content, and content is not necessarily going to make the scene full of humanity or feel compassion and amusement and humor", Kaufman told The Hollywood Reporter. He particularly singled out the way Adams rolls her eyes in opposite directions while she and Sutherland have dinner as something that a pod person could not and would never do.

Release

Box office
Invasion of the Body Snatchers premiered in the United States on December 22, 1978, showing on 445 screens nationally. Between its premiere and December 25, the film had earned a total of $1,298,129 in box office sales. It would go on to gross a total of nearly $25 million in the United States (equivalent to $ million in ).

On the film's 40th anniversary, Kaufman believes the film may have seemed timely when it came out since the Jonestown mass suicide had occurred a month earlier and still dominated the news: "That was a case of a lot of people from San Francisco were looking for a better world and suddenly found themselves in pod-dom, and it was fatal. It could not have been a more pointed reason for watching the movie."

Critical reception

Contemporaneous
The New Yorkers Pauline Kael was a particular fan of the film, writing that it "may be the best film of its kind ever made". Variety wrote that it "validates the entire concept of remakes. This new version of Don Siegel's 1956 cult classic not only matches the original in horrific tone and effect, but exceeds it in both conception and execution." Gene Siskel gave the film three stars out of four and said it was "one of the more entertaining films in what has turned out to be a dismal Christmas movie season". Kevin Thomas of the Los Angeles Times called it "a thoroughly scary success in its own right. Not literally a remake—it's more of a sequel, actually—this handsome, highly imaginative film generates its own implications from Finney's sturdy allegory of dehumanization and manages even to have some fun in the process."

The film was not without negative criticism. The New York Timess Janet Maslin wrote that the "creepiness [Kaufman] generates is so crazily ubiquitous it becomes funny." Roger Ebert wrote that it "was said to have something to do with Watergate and keeping tabs on those who are not like you", and called Kael's praise for the film "inexplicable", while Time magazine's Richard Schickel labeled its screenplay "laughably literal". Phil Hardy's Aurum Film Encyclopedia called Kaufman's direction "less sure" than the screenplay.

The film received a nomination from the Writers Guild of America for Best Drama Adapted from Another Medium. The film was also nominated for the Hugo Award for Best Dramatic Presentation. It was also recognized by the Academy of Science Fiction, Fantasy and Horror Films. Philip Kaufman won Best Director, and the film was nominated Best Science Fiction Film. Donald Sutherland, Brooke Adams, and Leonard Nimoy received additional nominations for their performances.

Subsequent assessment
Invasion of the Body Snatchers (1978) has been named among the greatest film remakes ever made, by several publications, including Rolling Stone.

Film scholar M. Keith Booker posited that the film's "paranoid atmosphere" links it to other films outside the science fiction genre, and that it "bears a clear family resemblance to paranoid conspiracy thrillers like Alan J. Pakula's The Parallax View (1974)". Chris Barsanti, in The Sci-Fi Movie Guide (2014), praised the performances of Adams and Sutherland, but criticized some elements of the film, writing: "The subtlety of Donald Siegel's original gives way to gaudy f/x and self-consciously artsy camerawork ... the film is overindulgently long, too, though it certainly has its shocking moments."

On review aggregator website Rotten Tomatoes, the film has received an approval rating of 92% based on 61 reviews and an average rating of 8.1/10. The site's consensus reads, "Employing gritty camerawork and evocative sound effects, Invasion of the Body Snatchers is a powerful remake that expands upon themes and ideas only lightly explored in the original." On Metacritic, the film has a weighted average score of 75 out of 100 based on 15 critics, indicating "generally favorable reviews".

In a 2018 review published by Complex, the film was ranked among the greatest science fiction films of all time: "Invasion of the Body Snatchers is doubly impressive; it both improves upon the '56 film and Jack Finney's literary source material with a scarier disposition and more layered character development."

Analysis
The German scholar Christian Knöppler wrote that the film was in many ways a lamentation for the end of the counterculture of the 1960s that was especially associated with San Francisco. Philip Kaufman has described the 1960s as a brief moment of time when Americans "woke up from the conforming, other-directed life" that he views as characteristic of American life. Both the characters of Matthew and Elizabeth appear to be "ex-hippies" who have abandoned their youthful utopian dreams sometime in the 1970s by going to work for the city of San Francisco as health inspectors, thereby becoming part of "the system", which foreshadows both characters' replacement by the pod people. Likewise, the Bellices are products of the counterculture of the 1960s. Jack Bellice wears a shabby U.S. Army jacket and has a deep distrust of the U.S. government, which implies that he was involved in protest movements in the past, perhaps against the Vietnam war. Likewise, Nancy Bellice believes in UFOs and has a fondness for pseudoscientific literature such as Immanuel Velikovsky's 1950 book Worlds in Collision, which strongly suggests that she believes "in some sort of New Age esotericism". Knöppler wrote: "For the Bellices, the revelation of an inhuman, all-encompassing  conspiracy that enforces mindless conformity is hardly a paradigm shiftit is the world they already live in. Consequently, the Bellices, Nancy in particular, adopt to the new situation rather quickly". Notably, Nancy's "esoteric UFO beliefs" allow her to be the first character to deduce the origins of the pod people and what they are doing, though in the end, the countercultural background of the Bellicies only proves to a marginal advantage as "they cannot escape assimilation by the pods, they just see it coming".

The film offers a strong critique of consumerism. The character of Geoffrey spends his free time mindlessly watching television commercials, a trait that is continued by the pod version of him. The pod version of Geoffrey tells Matthew and Elizabeth to accept being replaced because "nothing changes, you have the same life, the same clothes, the same car", a statement that implies that materialism is the only thing that matters in life, and which Geoffrey believes will entice Matthew and Elizabeth to accept being replaced. Likewise, the soulless, emotion-free life of the pod people is presented as an improvement by the pod version of Dr. Kibner who says "You'll be born again into an untroubled world. Free of anxiety, fear, hate". In the 1956 version, the equivalent statement was "You'll be born again into an untroubled world. Free of love, desire, ambition and faith", a change of emphasis that implies it is only unwanted emotions that are the issue in 1978 as compared to 1956. The film argues that people in 1970s San Francisco were already living in disengaged states, having shallow relationships with other people; instinctively seeking distance from any problems; and being so preoccupied with consumerism that this allows the pod people to take over San Francisco without much of the population noticing what is going on. Notably, when the running man tries to warn Matthew and Elizabeth, they shun him as a nuisance. When the running man is killed by the pod people, Matthew and Elizabeth do not stop their car and instead drive on to Dr. Kibner's party to avoid being late, blithely trusting that the authorities will handle the incident. At the party, Dr. Kibner tells Elizabeth "you want to shut your feelings off, withdraw. Maybe make believe it wasn't happening, because then you don't have to deal with it", a diagnosis that she admits is an accurate summary of her issues with Geoffrey. It is not clear if Dr. Kibner is a pod duplicate or not at this point in the film, and accordingly it is impossible to judge if this is a sincere statement or an attempt to keep Elizabeth from learning the truth. Regardless, the film does argue that a trend towards "emotional disengagement and apathy" was already prevalent in San Francisco that prefigures the state of being a pod person, who have no feelings at all. Though the pod people are aliens, the film maintains that the state of being a pod person is merely pushing present trends in American life to their logical extremes.

By the 1970s, there were concerns about the decline of the nuclear family and with it traditional American values. Early on, Dr. Kibner states that "the whole family unit is shot to hell", which explains the dysfunctional lives of many Americans. Despite the film's sympathy for the counterculture, Knöppler wrote that the film does seem to express some approval of this thesis, as notably the married Bellices seem more happy than Elizabeth does with her common-law relationship with Geoffrey. The character of Dr. Kibner, a successful author of vapid self-help books, satirizes many of the pop-psychiatry "self-help gurus" who were popular at the time. Before any evidence of the pod people has emerged, Jack has only already accused Dr. Kibner of trying to "change people to fit the world", a description that equally fits with the pod version of Dr. Kibner. The film expresses much distrust of psychiatrists such as Kibner, who are portrayed as seeking to limit the human experiences and with promoting a deracinated consumerism. Unlike the 1956 version, where the U.S. government is presented as a benign force, which once alerted to the pod invasion, promptly took action by organizing a quarantine of the pod-infested small town of Santa Mira  (though this happy ending was added at the insistence of the studio), the government is presented as a far more sinister and malign force in the 1978 version. The pod people have appeared to taken complete control of the state, and ruthlessly use the power of the state to complete their conquest of the earth. Even the few civil servants who have possibly not been replaced appear as ineffective. Knöppler argued that the change in the view of the government from 1956 to 1978 reflected the legacy of the Vietnam war and the Watergate scandal, which caused many Americans to have a jaundiced view of their government.

Home video
Invasion of the Body Snatchers was released on VHS and DVD in the United States, Australia and many European countries. The film was released on Blu-ray Disc in the United States in 2010 by MGM Home Entertainment. Then released once more on Blu-ray in 2013 by Arrow Video in the United Kingdom, and Shout! Factory in the United States and Canada in 2016, using a new 2K scan of the interpositive in addition to new and legacy extras. The Shout! release has since been out of print. A Native 4K Ultra HD Blu-ray was released on November 23, 2021, through Kino Lorber who also released a remastered Blu-ray on February 1, 2022.

Legacy
The Chicago Film Critics Association named it the 59th-scariest film ever made.

The 1992 Darkwing Duck episode "Twin Beaks" features mutant cabbages who try to replace all living being on Earth. The plot of the episode is inspired by the movie.

The film was parodied in the 2012 SpongeBob SquarePants episode "Planet of the Jellyfish" featuring characters from Bikini Bottom being replaced by alien clones in their sleep. A brief scene involving SpongeBob’s pet snail Gary having his clone hybridized with a houseplant is a direct reference to the 1978 remake's dog hybrid.

In 2018, Starkid Productions would later make a musical that is heavily based on this film named The Guy Who Didn't Like Musicals.

See also
 List of science fiction horror films
 List of science fiction films of the 1970s
 List of American films of 1978

Notes

References

Works cited

External links

 
 
 
 
 

1978 films
1978 horror films
1970s science fiction thriller films
1970s dystopian films
1970s psychological thriller films
Alien invasions in films
American psychological horror films
American science fiction horror films
Apocalyptic films
Body Snatchers films
1970s English-language films
Films directed by Philip Kaufman
Films set in San Francisco
Films set in the San Francisco Bay Area
Films shot in San Francisco
Horror film remakes
Science fiction film remakes
Films with screenplays by W. D. Richter
United Artists films
1970s science fiction horror films
Remakes of American films
Films about extraterrestrial life
1970s American films